Vladimir Engelsovich Legotine; born 25 April 1970) is a Russian cross-country skier who has competed since 1993. His best World Cup finish was ninth twice, earning them in 1995 and 1998.

Legotine also competed in two Winter Olympics, earning his best finish of ninth in the 30 km event at Nagano in 1998. His best finish at the FIS Nordic World Ski Championships was 10th in the 10 km + 15 km combined pursuit event at Thunder Bay in 1995.

Cross-country skiing results
All results are sourced from the International Ski Federation (FIS).

Olympic Games

World Championships

World Cup

Season standings

Team podiums
 1 victory – (1 ) 
 2 podiums – (2 )

References

Olympic 4 x 10 km relay results: 1936-2002

External links

1970 births
Cross-country skiers at the 1994 Winter Olympics
Cross-country skiers at the 1998 Winter Olympics
Living people
Olympic cross-country skiers of Russia
Russian male cross-country skiers